Oregon Community Foundation (OCF) is a non-profit organisation with the mission of improving lives for all Oregonians through the power of philanthropy.

It is the ninth largest community foundation in the United States as ranked by asset size in U.S. dollars as of 2017. OCF serves the entire state of Oregon through its offices located in Portland, Bend, Eugene, Medford and Salem.

In 2021, Oregon Community Foundation announced nearly $1 million in arts and culture recovery grants. In the same year, the Foundation said that it had doubled giving during the pandemic.

See also
 Community foundation

References

External links
Oregon Community Foundation Official Site
Community: How Our Work Happens at OCF
Here for Oregon. Here for Good: OCF celebrates 40 years working to improve life in Oregon and promote effective philanthropy.

Community foundations based in the United States
Organizations established in 1973
Organizations based in Portland, Oregon
1973 establishments in Oregon
Non-profit organizations based in Oregon